The 1996 Minnesota Senate election was held in the U.S. state of Minnesota on November 5, 1996, to elect members to the Senate of the 80th and 81st Minnesota Legislatures. A primary election was held on September 10, 1996.

The Minnesota Democratic–Farmer–Labor Party (DFL) won a majority of seats, remaining the majority party, followed by the Republican Party of Minnesota. The new Legislature convened on January 7, 1997.

The Independent-Republican Party had changed its name back to the Republican Party on September 23, 1995.

Results

See also
 Minnesota House of Representatives election, 1996
 Minnesota gubernatorial election, 1994

References

1996 Minnesota elections
Minnesota
Minnesota Senate elections